The Murmur of the Shell (Školjka šumi) is a Croatian film directed by Miroslav Međimorec. It was released in 1990.

External links
 

1990 films
Croatian drama films
1990s Croatian-language films
Yugoslav drama films